Abdullah Al-Jamhi (Arabic:عبد الله الجمحي) (born 1 October 1991) is an Emirati footballer who plays for Masfout as a winger, most recently for Ajman Club.

External links

References

1991 births
Emirati footballers
Living people
Ajman Club players
Al Shabab Al Arabi Club Dubai players
Al-Ittihad Kalba SC players
Al Wahda FC players
Al-Shaab CSC players
Masfout Club players
UAE Pro League players
UAE First Division League players
Association football wingers
Place of birth missing (living people)